This is a list of public art in the London Borough of Ealing.

Acton

Ealing

Greenford and Perivale

Hanwell

Northolt

Southall

References

External links
 

Ealing
Ealing
Tourist attractions in the London Borough of Ealing